A phon is a unit of loudness.

Phon may also refer to::

 Phon district, Khon Kaen Province, Thailand
 Pauline Hanson's One Nation, an Australian political party

People with the given name 
 Phon Sangsingkeo (1907–1980), Thai doctor
 Chheng Phon (1930–2016), Cambodian artist
 Pauline Dy Phon (1933–2010), Cambodian botanist
 Phon Martdee (born 1958), Thai-born Australian Muay Thai instructor

See also 
 Fon (disambiguation)
 Phone (disambiguation)
 Phons O'Mara (1887–1958), Irish politician and businessman